The 2020–21 Basketball Champions League was the 5th season of the Basketball Champions League (BCL), the premier European-wide professional basketball competition for clubs launched and managed by FIBA. The season began on 15 September 2020 and ended on 9 May 2021.

San Pablo Burgos won its second consecutive championship, after defeating Pınar Karşıyaka in the final in Nizhny Novgorod. As champions, they qualified for the 2022 FIBA Intercontinental Cup.

Teams

Team allocation
44 teams played in the 2020–21 Basketball Champions League (28 teams directly qualify for the group competition, while 16 teams play 2 qualifying rounds for the remaining 4 places in the group stage). 
Abd: Abandoned season because of the COVID-19 pandemic
1st, 2nd, etc.: Place in the domestic competition
CLR: Teams qualified based on their Basketball Champions League rankings
WC: Wild card

Notes

Referees

Round and draw dates 
The schedule of the competition was be as follows. On December 3, the Basketball Champions League Board has approved a change of format for the 2020-21 Play-Offs and Finals.

Qualifying rounds

Draw 
The 16 teams that entered in the first round were divided into four pots based firstly on the competition's club ranking and, for clubs that have not yet participated in the competition, on the country ranking.

For the first qualification round (QR1), teams from Pot 3 were drawn against teams from Pot 2, and teams from Pot 4 faced teams from Pot 1. Clubs from Pot 1 and 2 were seeded, and played the second leg at home. Games were played on September 15–18. The eight winners then qualified for the second qualification round (QR2).

For the second round (QR2), the winners of Pot 3 and Pot 2 faced the winners of Pot 4 and Pot 1. The winners from Pot 4 and Pot 1 were seeded, and played the second leg at home. Games were played on September 22–25. The four winners then qualified for the 2020–21 Basketball Champions League regular reason and joined the 28 directly qualified teams in the main draw.

Change of Qualifying format 
On August 25, 2020, it was announced, in order to protect the health and guarantee the safety of players, coaches and officials, but also to safeguard a fair competition, and to properly organize game operations, the decision has been taken to modify the competition system from home-away games, to a tournament format, with single games for each Qualification Round.

Four tournaments took place, each consisting of two semifinals games and of one final game, where the semifinals were played as the BCL qualification round 1 and the final as the BCL qualification round 2. These Qualification tournaments took place in two different locations:
 Group A and B: Tassos Papadopoulos Eleftheria Indoor Hall at Nicosia, Cyprus.
 Group C and D: Arena Botevgrad at Botevgrad, Bulgaria.

Draw pots

* Example of 1 point for Igokea from 2016 to 2017 season means that the FIBA's "last three season points" rule applies to the last (three) BCL seasons of the particular club, not the last three BCL seasons in general.

Results

Qualification Group A
Semifinals were played on 23 September 2020 and Final took place on 25 September 2020 at Tassos Papadopoulos Eleftheria Indoor Hall in Nicosia, Cyprus.

Qualification Group B
Semifinals were played on 22 September 2020 and Final took place on 24 September 2020 at Tassos Papadopoulos Eleftheria Indoor Hall in Nicosia, Cyprus.

Qualification Group C
Semifinals were played on 23 September 2020 and Final took place on 25 September 2020 at Arena Botevgrad in Botevgrad, Bulgaria.

Qualification Group D
Semifinals were played on 22 September 2020 and Final took place on 24 September 2020 at Arena Botevgrad in Botevgrad, Bulgaria.

Regular season

Draw 
The 28 teams that entered in the regular season directly were divided into seven pots based firstly on the club ranking and, for clubs that have not yet participated in the competition, on the country ranking. Eighth pot is reserved for winners of qualifying rounds.

Initially, teams were divided into groups of eight teams. However, due to the COVID-19 pandemic, groups were split with the aim to the reduce the number of games and to make easier to play possible postponed matches.

Notes

 Indicates teams with no club points, therefor using the country points as a tiebreaker.

Group A

Group B

Group C

Group D

Group E

Group F

Group G

Group H

Playoffs 
Sixteen teams advance to the Play-off phase, consisting of a new group format of four groups with four teams each.

A draw determined the new four groups (each group had respectively two teams having finished first and two teams having finished second in their regular season group) that played home and away games over the month of March. No country protection, only group protection was applied during the draw.

Clubs played six games each in a round robin system (three games home, three away), with the first two teams in each group qualifying for a Final 8 tournament that concluded the 2020–21 season. The playoffs started on March 2–3, 2021.

The draw of this second phase of the competition was conducted on February 2, at the Patrick Baumann House of Basketball.

Draw

Group I

Group J

Group K

Group L

Final Eight

The concluding Final Eight tournament was played in Nizhny Novgorod, Russia, between 5 May and 9 May 2021.

Draw

Bracket

Quarterfinals
The quarterfinals were played on 5–6 May 2021.

|}

Semifinals
The semifinals were played on 7 May 2021.

|}

Third place game
The third place game was played on 9 May 2021.

|}

Final

The final was played on 9 May 2021.

|}

Individual awards

Season awards
The annual season awards were announced on 5 May.

Star Lineup

MVP of the Month

Play-Offs MVP

See also
2020–21 FIBA Europe Cup
2020–21 EuroLeague
2020–21 EuroCup Basketball

References

External links
Basketball Champions League (official website)
FIBA (official website)

Basketball Champions League
2020–21 Basketball Champions League